Hall-London House is a historic home located in Pittsboro, Chatham County, North Carolina.  It was built in about 1836, is a tall two-story, five bay Federal / Greek Revival style frame dwelling.  It features a broad Gothic Revival style front porch.  A two-story rear ell was added about 1900.

It was listed on the National Register of Historic Places in 1982.  It is located in the Pittsboro Historic District.

It has been occupied by Bradshaw & Robinson, LLP, a local law firm, since 2000, and its predecessor law firms going back to 1984.

References

Houses on the National Register of Historic Places in North Carolina
Federal architecture in North Carolina
Greek Revival houses in North Carolina
Gothic Revival architecture in North Carolina
Houses completed in 1836
Houses in Chatham County, North Carolina
National Register of Historic Places in Chatham County, North Carolina
Pittsboro, North Carolina
Individually listed contributing properties to historic districts on the National Register in North Carolina